Didier Tarquin (born 20 January 1967, Toulon) is a French cartoonist and comic book writer.

He spent the first ten years of his life in Touggourt (Algeria) in the Sahara desert.  He chose to become a cartoonist during a cartoon summer camp.  His professional career started in 1990 with Soleil comics but he attained real fame in 1994 with the series Lanfeust of Troy in collaboration with Christophe Arleston.

Works 
 Lanfeust of Troy
 Lanfeust of the stars
 Gnomes of Troy
 Roq

References 
 Biography (fr)

1967 births
Living people
Artists from Toulon
French cartoonists